Kerrang! TV is a British music television channel owned by Channel Four Television Corporation, with permission to use the Kerrang! brand from Bauer. 

As of 2022, all of its programme content is music videos, the majority of which is open-schedule so as to permit text requests from their playlist.

Background

The TV station's playlist is mainly nu metal, pop punk/skate punk and indie rock, although with some unusual exceptions. Certain acts such as Tenacious D and Limp Bizkit got higher-than-average play rates, due to higher rates of text requests. Themed 30-minute segments often covered artists who were on the playlist, with large numbers of videos, most noticeably Green Day, Panic! at the Disco, Paramore and You Me at Six.

The station unusually guaranteed to play a requested video, unlike others where a voting system was in place. However, it may have taken some time for the video to be played.

It shares much of the ethos of its namesake magazine, although it will not go as far as to play unsigned acts or veer too far off music which is accepted by the mainstream. Heavy metal is least played, as death metal and black metal are very rarely played, although extreme metal act Cradle of Filth had appeared on late-night and even daytime Kerrang! TV from time to time. More mainstream rock acts are favoured. British and American music is most featured, European music is played rarely; although Rammstein (Germany) have featured weekly. Gothic metal and power metal are rarely played.

Many of the videos shown are heavily censored to remove profanity, violence, and references to God and religion. The censorship usually takes the form of dubbing out the offending phrase or by blurring the picture. This is often criticised by a lot of viewers, as of the fact that even the watershed slot (9pm-5:30am) also doesn't show any uncensored videos. The response from the channel is, running uncensored videos during nighttime may increase the risk of it being broadcast during daytime.

Video countdowns are often shown on the channel.

The station had an annual video countdown called the Rock 100, which covered the 100 most requested videos on the station (Rock or otherwise) in the previous year, and with links between blocks of tracks given by one of the featured bands. In 2005 Good Charlotte presented the Rock 100 from a strip club in Manchester. In 2009 Charlie Simpson made a voice-over for the show with clips from people's votes in the Download festival.

The channel is available on many platforms including Sky and Virgin Media. It is part of a network of channels owned by The Box Plus Network, which include 4Music, Box Hits, Kiss, The Box and Magic. On 2 April 2013, all Box Television channels went free-to-air on satellite, apart from 4Music which went free-to-view. As a result, the channels were removed from the Sky EPG in Ireland. However, Kerrang! TV launched on Freesat on 15 April 2013, alongside three other Box Television channels, but was removed on 24 March 2015. Kerrang! and its sister channels returned to Freesat on 8 December 2021 alongside Channel 4 HD.

From 27 September to 17 November 2021, Kerrang! broadcast a simulcast of The Box after the activation of a fire suppressant system at the premises of Red Bee Media on 25 September 2021. It was restored on 18 November 2021.

Launch
The first broadcast of Kerrang! TV had a countdown of voters' most-desired videos. The most popular choice and the first video shown on Kerrang! TV was Nirvana's "Smells Like Teen Spirit". Limp Bizkit's "Break Stuff" and Everlast's "Black Jesus" were also in the first three videos played.

References

External links

TV
Channel 4 television channels
Music video networks in the United Kingdom
Television channels and stations established in 2001